Anerastia mitochroella is a species of snout moth in the genus Anerastia. It was described by Émile Louis Ragonot in 1888, and is known from Argentina.

References

Moths described in 1888
Anerastiini
Moths of South America